Dr. Jaykumar Jalaj (born in Lalitpur, U.P. on 2 October 1934) is a prominent figure in Hindi literature. He was educated in and later taught at Allahabad University. He started his career as a lecturer of Hindi in colleges of Madhya Pradesh. The colleges included those in Satna, Rewa, Bareli, Sehore, all run by the Government of Madhya Pradesh. He taught in the Govt. Arts & Science Post-Graduate College, Ratlam, as first as Professor and Head of Hindi department for 10 years and then from 1981 as principal for 13 years.

Books authored
 'Kinaare Se Dhaar Tak' (Poems, 2013) Published by Triveni Prakashan, Allahabad & Hindi Granth Karyalay, Mumbai. .
 'Suraj si Astha' (Poems, 1958), 
 'Sanskrit Natyasastra: Ek Punarvicara' (Research and review, 1962), 
 'Dhvani Aur Dhvanigram Sastra' (Linguistics, 1962), 
 'Aitihasika Bhasa Vijnan' (1972,2001), 
 'Sanskrit aur Hindi Nataka: Racana evam Rangakarma' (Research and review 1985,2000), 
 BHAGAVAN MAHAVIR KA BUNIYADI CHINTAN First published in 2002 34st Hindi Edition, 2012  Published by Hindi Granth Karyalay, Mumbai and translated in 9 languages
Seva Nivratt Hain - Bhajan Main Aaiye, First Published in 2021 उपग्रह प्रकाशन स्टेशन रोड रतलाम

Translations
(from Sanskrit) 
RATNAKARANDA SRAVAKACARA by Acarya Samantabhadra 
Pandit Nathuram Premi Research Series Volume 2 
(Three editions: 2006, 2006, 2012) 

SAMADHITANTRA by Acarya Pujyapada 
Pandit Nathuram Premi Research Series Volume 5
(Three editions: 2006, 2006, 2008) 

TATTVARTHASUTRA by Acarya Prabhacandra 
Pandit Nathuram Premi Research Series Volume 7
(One edition: 2009) 

TATTVARTHASUTRA by Acarya Prabhacandra 
Pandit Nathuram Premi Research Series Volume 20
(One edition: 2012) 

 Pūjyapāda. . Sanskrit text, Hindi translation, Introduction and Shloka Index. Hindi translation by Dr Jaykumar Jalaj. Edited by Manish Modi. Pandit Nathuram Premi Research Series Volume 14. Mumbai: Hindi Granth Karyalay, 2007. .

ISTOPADESA by Acarya Pujyapada 
Pandit Nathuram Premi Research Series Volume 14 
(Three editions: 2007, 2009, 2013) 

(from Apabhramsha) 
PARAMATMAPRAKASA by Acarya Joindu 
Pandit Nathuram Premi Research Series Volume 9
(One edition: 2007) 

YOGASARA by Acarya Joindu 
Pandit Nathuram Premi Research Series Volume 10
(Two editions: 2007, 2009) 

(from Prakrit) 
ATTHAPAHUDA by Acarya Kundakunda 
Pandit Nathuram Premi Research Series Volume 6
(Three editions: 2006, 2008, 2013) 

DHYANASATAKA by Kshamashramana Jinabhadragani 
Pandit Nathuram Premi Research Series Volume 12
(Two editions: 2009, 2008) 

RAYANASARA by Acarya Kundakunda 
Pandit Nathuram Premi Research Series Volume 21
(One edition: 2011) 

DRAVYASAMGRAHA by Acarya Nemicandra 
Pandit Nathuram Premi Research Series Volume 24
(One edition: 2009) 

SAMAYASARA by Acarya Kundakunda 
Pandit Nathuram Premi Research Series Volume 30
(Two editions: 2012) 

PRAVACANASARA by Acarya Kundakunda 
Paras Moolchand Chatter Charitable Trust
(One edition: 2014)

Honours
Dr Jaykumar Jalaj has been honoured by various awards. 
1967: Kamata Prasada Guru Award, Vishvanatha Award
1987: Madhya Pradesh Government Bhoj Award 
1998: Sahitya Sarasvat award by Hindi Sahitya Sammelan

References

1934 births
Hindi-language writers
Living people